David Adams and John-Laffnie de Jager were the defending champions but only Adams competed that year with Marius Barnard.

Adams and Barnard lost in the first round to Dominik Hrbatý and David Prinosil.

Jonas Björkman and Roger Federer won in the final 6–3, 6–0 against Petr Pála and Pavel Vízner.

Seeds
Champion seeds are indicated in bold text while text in italics indicates the round in which those seeds were eliminated.

 Yevgeny Kafelnikov /  Max Mirnyi (first round)
 Jiří Novák /  David Rikl (quarterfinals)
 Joshua Eagle /  Sandon Stolle (first round)
 Dominik Hrbatý /  David Prinosil (quarterfinals)

Draw

External links
 2001 ABN AMRO World Tennis Tournament Doubles draw

2001 ABN AMRO World Tennis Tournament
Doubles